Peter Draisaitl (born 7 December 1965) is a German former professional ice hockey centre, and head coach. He is the current head coach of Krefeld Pinguine of the DEL2. He was previously the head coach of Kölner Haie (Cologne Sharks) of the Deutsche Eishockey Liga (DEL) from November 2017  until January 2019. 

Draisaitl was born as part of the German minority in Czechoslovakia and played in numerous international tournaments as a member of the West German and German national team, including competing at the 1988, 1992, and 1998 Winter Olympics. He also spent eighteen years playing professional hockey in Germany, mostly with Mannheimer ERC (now Adler Mannheim) and Kölner EC (now Kölner Haie). He also played briefly with Moskitos Essen and Revierlöwen Oberhausen.

Draisaitl is the father of 2020 Hart Memorial Trophy winner, Leon Draisaitl, who was selected 3rd overall by the Edmonton Oilers in the 2014 NHL Entry Draft.

Career statistics

Regular season and playoffs

International

References

External links

1965 births
Living people
Czechoslovak people of German descent
German ice hockey coaches
German ice hockey centres
Ice hockey players at the 1988 Winter Olympics
Ice hockey players at the 1992 Winter Olympics
Ice hockey players at the 1998 Winter Olympics
Olympic ice hockey players of Germany
Olympic ice hockey players of West Germany
Sportspeople from Karviná